Ludovico de Torres (1552 – 8 July 1609) was a Roman Catholic prelate who served as Cardinal-Priest of San Pancrazio (1606-1609) and Archbishop of Monreale (1588-1609).

Biography
Ludovico de Torres was born in Rome in 1552. His family was originally from Málaga, Spain. He studied law at the University of Perugia and then earned a doctorate from the University of Bologna in both canon and civil law. In 1572, he served as vicar general of the diocese of Monreale where his uncle was bishop; and then returned to Rome where he served as vicar of S. Lorenzo in Damaso, Canon of the patriarchal Liberian basilica, and Scrittore apostolico to the Curia. On 22 January 1588, he was appointed during the papacy of Pope Sixtus V as Archbishop of Monreale succeeding his uncle of the same name.  On 31 January 1588, he was consecrated bishop at the church of S. Lorenzo in Damaso by Gabriele Paleotti, Archbishop of Bologna, with Silvio Savelli, Archbishop of Rossano, and José Esteve Juan, Bishop of Vieste, serving as co-consecrators. In the consistory of 11 September 1606, he was elevated by Pope Paul V to Cardinal-Priest and on 19 December 1606, received the title of San Pancrazio. On July 4, 1607, he was named librarian of the Holy Roman Church. He served as Archbishop of Monreale until his death on 8 Jul 1609. He is buried in the metropolitan cathedral of Monreale. He was the uncle of Cardinal Cosimo de Torres, who later served as Archbishop of Monreale (1634-1642); and was a close friend of poet Torquato Tasso.

Episcopal succession
While bishop, he was the principal consecrator of:

and the principal co-consecrator of:

References 

16th-century Roman Catholic archbishops in Sicily
17th-century Roman Catholic archbishops in Sicily
Bishops appointed by Pope Sixtus V
Bishops appointed by Pope Paul V
1552 births
1609 deaths